Aethes scalana is a species of moth of the family Tortricidae. It was described by Zerny in 1927. It is found in Spain, Italy, Ukraine, Russia, Algeria, the Caucasus, Tajikistan, Kazakhstan and Iran.

Adults are on wing from August to September.

References

scalana
Moths described in 1927
Moths of Asia
Moths of Europe
Moths of Africa